Paul Westmacott Richards  (9 December 1908 – 4 October 1995) was a British botanist.

A student at Trinity College, Cambridge, from 1927, he participated in the 1929 Oxford University Expedition to Moraballi Creek in British Guiana, studying the tropical forest canopy. Still at Cambridge, he then joined in the 1932 Oxford University Expedition to Baram in Sarawak, led by ex-Trinity undergraduate, ecologist Tom Harrisson.

In 1949 he moved from Cambridge to be Chair of Botany in the University College of North Wales, Bangor, and remained there until he retired in 1976.

He was the author of The Tropical Rain Forest (1952).

His son is Cambridge professor Martin Richards (psychologist) Awarded the Linnean Medal in 1979.

References

1908 births
1995 deaths
Commanders of the Order of the British Empire